The British five pound (£5) coin is a commemorative denomination of sterling coinage. As of October 2022, the obverse of new coins feature the profile of King Charles III. The obverse previously depicted Queen Elizabeth II between the coin's introduction in 1990 and the Queen's death in 2022. Two different portraits of the Queen graced the coin, with the last design by Ian Rank-Broadley being introduced in 1998. The coin has no standard reverse; instead it is altered each year to commemorate important events. Variant obverses have also been used on occasion.

The coin is a continuation of the crown, which after decimalisation became the commemorative twenty-five pence coin. The twenty-five pence was discontinued in 1981 after creating a large coin with such small value became prohibitively expensive. The five pound coin shares the same dimensions as the twenty-five pence coin, and the five shilling coin before it, but has a nominal value twenty times greater.

Five pound coins are legal tender but are intended as souvenirs and are rarely seen in circulation.  The coins are sold by the Royal Mint at face value and also, with presentation folders, at a premium to that face value. The 2010 coins, with such folders, were sold for £9.95 each. As of 2020 the coin and folder cost £13.

A £5 memorial crown featuring the image of Charles III was released on 3 October 2022.

Separate five pound coin designs have also been released in various British crown dependencies and British Overseas Territories. These are outside of the scope of this article and are not listed below.

Design

Queen Elizabeth II

The designs which have appeared on the five pound coin's reverse are summarised in the table below.

Charles III

C = Circulating

Coin Sets
Additionally, the Royal Mint have released a number of five pound coin sets in silver proof quality.

2012 Olympics Set
A series of 18 commemorative £5 coins were issued to celebrate the London 2012 Olympics.

	Mind    Stonehenge
	Mind	Big Ben	
	Mind	Angel of the North	
	Mind	Flying Scotsman
	Mind	The Globe Theatre
	Mind	Sir Isaac Newton
	Body	Giant's Causeway
	Body	The Great British Oak
	Body	River Thames
	Body	Weather	
	Body	British Fauna	
	Body	The Coastline of Britain
	Spirit	Courage
	Spirit	Pageantry	
	Spirit	Unity
	Spirit	Music
	Spirit	Humour
	Spirit	Tolerance

Queen's Portrait Set
Four proof coins were released as part of the 2013 Queen's Portrait set. These coins feature the four portraits of Elizabeth II that appear on British coins.

The Portrait of Britain Set
Sixteen silver proof coins have been released as part of the 'Portrait of Britain' set.

2015 Big Ben (Elizabeth Tower)
2015 Tower Bridge
2015 Trafalgar Square
2015 Buckingham Palace
2016 White Cliffs of Dover
2016 Giant's Causeway 
2016 Lake District
2016 Snowdonia
2017 Westminster Abbey
2017 Hampton Court Palace
2017 Downing Street 
2017 Edinburgh Castle 
2018 Blackpool
2018 Brighton
2018 Tenby
2018 Southwold

The First World War Set
A series of silver proof coins have been released as part of the 'First World War' set. 36 coins were released as part of this series.

2014 - British Expeditionary Force 
2014 - Royal Navy Coin
2014 - Home Front Coin
2014 - Walter Tull 
2014 - Propaganda
2014 - Howitzer Gun
2015 - Albert Ball VC
2015 - Animals at War
2015 - Submarines
2015 - Edith Cavell
2015 - Merchant Navy
2015 - Gallipoli
2016 - Poetry and Language
2016 - The Somme
2016 - Jutland
2016 - Jack Cornell VC
2016 - The Army 
2016 - Dreadnought
2017 - Noel Godfrey Chavasse VC
2017 - The dedication of the medical services
2017 - The cultural importance of the war artist
2017 - The Sopwith Camel
2017 - Gas warfare
2017 - The Battle of Arras
2018 - TE Lawrence
2018 - Ypres
2018 - Tanks
2018 - Royal Air force
2018 - Women in factories
2018 - Widows left behind
2018 - Remembrance Day
2018 - War Memorials
2018 - Poppies
2018 - Imperial War Museums
2018 - Commonwealth War Graves
2018 - Peace

References

External links

 
 Royal Mint – £5 coin, design and specifications

 
 

Coins of the United Kingdom
Five-base-unit coins